is a private music school in Chōfu, Tokyo, Japan.

History
Toho Gakuen was founded in 1948 in Ichigaya (Tokyo) as the Music School for Children, and two years later  moved to Sengawa (current address at Wakabacyo, Chōfu-shi, Tokyo) and opened the Toho High School of Music, to provide quality musical education to teenage girls. Nov.1954 moved to Sengawa (Wakabacyo, Chōfu-shi, Tokyo).  1955 saw the establishment of the Junior College and in 1961 the Junior College becomes the Toho Gakuen College Music Department. The College of Music was a pioneer in offering university-level degrees in music in Japan. In 1995 the Toho Orchestra Academy was established in Toyama and in 1999 opened the Toho Gakuen Graduate School, which offers postgraduate degrees.

Studies
Through its high school, college and graduate school, Toho Gakuen offers studies from preparatory diplomas to master's degrees in all orchestral instruments, piano, composition, conducting and musicology.

Notable staff members
 Hiroshi Wakasugi, conductor
Hitomi Kaneko, composer

Notable alumni

 Seiji Ozawa, conductor
 Kazuyoshi Akiyama, conductor,
 Tadaaki Otaka, conductor
 Hiroko Nakamura, pianist
 Tōru Yasunaga, violinist
 Koichiro Harada, founding member of the Tokyo String Quartet
 Sadao Harada, founding member of the Tokyo String Quartet
 Kazuhide Isomura, founding member of the Tokyo String Quartet
 Yoshiko Nakura, founding member of the Tokyo String Quartet
 Akiko Suwanai, violinist
 Nobuko Imai, violist
 Mayuko Kamio, violinist
 František Brikcius, cellist
 David Currie, conductor
 Aimi Kobayashi, pianist 
 Kokia, singer, composer
 Yukie Nishimura, pianist
 Yoko Nozaki, pianist
 Eiji Oue, conductor.  
 Heiichiro Ohyama, conductor
 Yūji Takahashi, composer, arranger, and pianist

References

External links
  

 
Private universities and colleges in Japan
Educational institutions established in 1961
Universities and colleges in Tokyo
1961 establishments in Japan
Chōfu, Tokyo